Enosis Agion Omologiton was a Cypriot football club based in Ayioi Omoloyites a settlement of Nicosia. In 1960-61 the team won the Cypriot Second Division but they didn't participate in the Cypriot First Division.

Later the team was dissolved.

Honours
Cypriot Second Division :1960-61

References

External links
 Cypriot Second Division#Winners
 1961–62 Cypriot First Division

Defunct football clubs in Cyprus